Ralph Cole was an English medieval university chancellor.

In 1231? and 1233–8, Cole was Chancellor of Oxford University. There is some confusion between Ralph Cole and Ralph de Maidstone, the Archdeacon of Chester, with respect to the first period of serving as Chancellor in 1231.

References

Year of birth unknown
Year of death unknown
English Roman Catholics
Chancellors of the University of Oxford
13th-century English people
13th-century Roman Catholics